Scopula linearia is a moth of the  family Geometridae. It is found in India (the Nilgiri mountains).

References

Moths described in 1891
linearia
Moths of Asia